Joseph Jacques (12 September 1944 – 4 February 1981) was an English professional footballer. He played for Preston North End, Lincoln City, Darlington, Southend United, Gillingham and Hartlepool United between 1961 and 1976, making over 300 appearances in the Football League. He died at the age of 36 following a heart attack at his Darlington home.

References

1944 births
Sportspeople from Consett
Footballers from County Durham
1981 deaths
English footballers
Association football defenders
Preston North End F.C. players
Gillingham F.C. players
Lincoln City F.C. players
Southend United F.C. players
Darlington F.C. players
Hartlepool United F.C. players
Dartford F.C. players
Crook Town A.F.C. players
English Football League players